Derek Michael Coombs (12 August 1931 – 30 December 2014) was a British Conservative politician. He was Member of Parliament for Birmingham Yardley from 1970 to 1974, when he lost to Labour's Sydney Tierney. He was subsequently a businessman, and later he was chairman of Prospect magazine.

Family
Coombs married twice, first, in Q. 1, 1959 in Sutton Coldfield, to the elder sister  Patricia  (b. Leeds North, Q4, 1930) of Peter O'Toole, by whom he had two sons, Sian (b. Q1, 1967) and Fiann (b. Q4, 1968).  Coombs is survived by his second wife, actress Jennifer Lonsdale, mother of his sons Jack and Adam, see below.

In 2010 his youngest son Adam, having just left Bryanston School, died of an accidental drug overdose in the hilltown of Manali, in India's Valley of the Gods, while on his gap year, before he was due to begin a philosophy degree course at Manchester University.

For about the last 11 of his 83 years Coombs suffered from progressive dementia.  He lived at Stepleton House, near Iwerne Courtney (Shroton) in Dorset, and in Chelsea, London. A well-attended memorial service was held in Blandford Forum Parish Church on Saturday, 31 January 2015, followed by a function in the Blandford Forum Corn Exchange.

Prospect magazine
Coombs, who once tried to buy the New Statesman, was Chairman of Prospect, the intellectual monthly magazine founded in 1995 by Coombs and by former Financial Times journalist David Goodhart, who edited it.  Coombs pumped £350,000 into the venture.  He had a regular column "Chairman's Corner" until 2005.  in 2008, George Robinson, a director of London-based hedge fund Sloane Robinson Investment Management, and Peter Hall, of boutique fund manager Hunter Hall, each acquired 26% of the title after Coombs, the magazine's chairman and largest shareholder, sold his 40% stake.

Business connections
In the 1950s, Coombs attempted, but failed, to acquire the film rights for the first four James Bond novels.

The Coombs family still owns the Bank and Insurance provider S & U plc, which specialises in pay-day loans and motor insurance for people with poor credit rating. Derek Coombs receives an estimated payment of around £120,000 per annum from the company in lieu of a pension arrangement  
S&U operates under the LoansAtHome4U and Advantage Finance brands, and the Coombs family still has influence.

The Coombs family further holds stakes in Metalrax, an engineering venture

References

External links 

Catalogue of Coombs' papers, held at the Modern Records Centre, University of Warwick

1937 births
2014 deaths
Conservative Party (UK) MPs for English constituencies
UK MPs 1970–1974